In geometry, a pseudosphere is a surface with constant negative Gaussian curvature.

A pseudosphere of radius  is a surface in  having curvature  in each point. Its name comes from the analogy with the sphere of radius , which is a surface of curvature . The term was introduced by Eugenio Beltrami in his 1868 paper on models of hyperbolic geometry.



Tractroid 

The same surface can be also described as the result of revolving a tractrix about its asymptote.
For this reason the pseudosphere is also called tractroid. As an example, the (half) pseudosphere (with radius 1) is the surface of revolution of the tractrix parametrized by

It is a singular space (the equator is a singularity), but away from the singularities, it has constant negative Gaussian curvature and therefore is locally isometric to a hyperbolic plane.

The name "pseudosphere" comes about because it has a two-dimensional surface of constant negative Gaussian curvature, just as a sphere has a surface with constant positive Gaussian curvature.
Just as the sphere has at every point a positively curved geometry of a dome the whole pseudosphere has at every point the negatively curved geometry of a saddle.

As early as 1693 Christiaan Huygens found that the volume and the surface area of the pseudosphere are finite, despite the infinite extent of the shape along the axis of rotation.

Universal covering space 

The half pseudosphere of curvature −1 is covered by the interior of a horocycle. Then the covering map is periodic in the  direction of period 2, and takes the horocycles  to the meridians of the pseudosphere and the vertical geodesics  to the tractrices that generate the pseudosphere. This mapping is a local isometry, and thus exhibits the portion  of the upper half-plane as the universal covering space of the pseudosphere. The precise mapping is

where

is the parametrization of the tractrix above.

Hyperboloid 

In some sources that use the hyperboloid model of the hyperbolic plane, the hyperboloid is referred to as a pseudosphere.
This usage of the word is because the hyperboloid can be thought of as a sphere of imaginary radius, embedded in a Minkowski space.

Pseudospherical surfaces 
A pseudospherical surface is a generalization of the pseudosphere. The tractroid is the simplest example. Other examples include the Dini's surfaces, breather surfaces, and the Kuen surface.

Relation to solutions to the Sine-Gordon equation 
Pseudospherical surfaces can be constructed from solutions to the Sine-Gordon equation. A sketch proof starts with reparametrizing the tractroid with coordinates in which the Gauss–Codazzi equations can be rewritten as the Sine-Gordon equation. 

In particular, for the tractroid the Gauss–Codazzi equations are the Sine-Gordon equation applied to the static soliton solution, so the Gauss–Codazzi equations are satisfied. In these coordinates the first and second fundamental forms are written in a way that makes clear the Gaussian curvature is -1 for any solution of the Sine-Gordon equations.

Then any solution to the Sine-Gordon equation can be used to specify a first and second fundamental form which satisfy the Gauss–Codazzi equations.

A few examples of Sine-Gordon solutions and their corresponding surface are given as follows:
 Static 1-soliton: pseudosphere
 Moving 1-soliton: Dini's surface
 Breather solution: Breather surface
 2-soliton: Kuen surface

See also
Hilbert's theorem (differential geometry)
Dini's surface
Gabriel's Horn
Hyperboloid
Hyperboloid structure
Quasi-sphere
Sine–Gordon equation
Sphere
Surface of revolution

References

External links
Non Euclid
Crocheting the Hyperbolic Plane: An Interview with David Henderson and Daina Taimina 
Norman Wildberger lecture 16, History of Mathematics, University of New South Wales. YouTube. 2012 May.
 Pseudospherical surfaces at the virtual math museum.

Differential geometry of surfaces
Hyperbolic geometry
Surfaces
Spheres
Surfaces of revolution of constant negative curvature